Fisher Folks is a 1911 silent film short directed by D. W. Griffith. It was produced and released by the Biograph Company.

Cast
Wilfred Lucas - Steve Hardester
Linda Arvidson - Bertha
Vivian Prescott - Cora
Verner Clarges - The Minister

uncredited
William J. Butler - Fisherman
Edward Dillon - At Fair
John T. Dillon - At Fair
Joseph Graybill - At Fair
Jeanie MacPherson - At Wedding
Claire McDowell - At Fair
W. Chrystie Miller - At Wedding
Alfred Paget - At Wedding/At Fair
W. C. Robinson - At Wedding/At Fair
Mack Sennett - At Fair
Kate Toncray - On Beach

References

External links
 Fisher Folks at IMDb.com
short clip of Fisher Folks at Internet Archive

1911 films
Films directed by D. W. Griffith
Biograph Company films
Silent American drama films
1911 drama films
American black-and-white films
American silent short films
1911 short films
1910s American films